José María Mijares (born 1921 in Havana, Cuba - d. March, 2004) was a Cuban contemporary visual artist. He began drawing in his adolescent years and entered the San Alejandro Academy of Fine Arts on a scholarship at the age of 16. His greatest influences were the artists of the "Havana School": Carlos Enríquez, René Portocarrero, Cundo Bermúdez, as well as his professors, most notable being modernist painter Fidelio Ponce. He was also a part of the influential group, Los Diez Pintores Concretos (the 10 Concrete Painters), or as they are usually referred to, Los Diez (the 10). Although the group had a relatively short life, 1959-1961, and exhibited together only a few times, they remain an important part of Cuba's art history especially in the pre-Castro years and leading up to the revolution. He left Cuba in 1968, resigning his teaching position at the academy when Fidel Castro came into power. Based in Miami, he continued to be a prolific painter and until his death in 2004, at the age of 82.

Biography 
Mijares was born in Havana, Cuba in 1921. He began studying art in 1936 at the San Alejandro Academy of Fine Arts, where his professors included Romañach, Menocal, Valderrama, Ramón Loy, and Caravia. He resided in Miami from 1968 until his death in 2004. Florida International University awarded him with an honorary doctorate in Fine Arts in 2001. He was also awarded the Cintas Fellowship (1970–1971), as well as the National Paintings Prize from the IV National Paintings, Engravings and Sculptures Salon. Mijares’ work has been exhibited at several major shows in Havana, Paris, Caracas, Port-au-Prince (Haiti), Sao Paulo, Tokyo, Washington D.C., and Miami, among other cities.

“Mijares is primarily a colorist, pure color constituting the substance of the forms of
his creation. Drawing as a rule provides firm support, bold outlines giving definition
and meaning to the whole. His thematic material is biological in character, based
on living organisms: the life latent with no static form imparts a poetic mystery
to his compositions .... As a colorist, Mijares continues a tradition long identified
with his country. He gives new meaning to the language of the past, however,
fashioning it into expressions that transcend boundaries of both time and place.”

Selected exhibitions 
1996
Mijares En Grande, Alfredo Martinez Gallery, Coral Gables, FL (solo)

1993
Cuba Through Her Artists, La Boheme Fine Art, Coral Gables, FL

1991
Art Miami, Miami, FL
Marpad Art Gallery, Coral Gables, FL

1987
Latin American Treasures, The Center for the Fine Arts, Miami, FL
Outside Cuba, Office of Hispanic Arts, Rutgers University, NJ

1981–1982
The Bass Museum of Art, Miami Beach, FL
The Cuban Me Fine Arts, Miami, FL
Outside Cuba, a traveling exhibition inaugurauseum of Art and Culture, Miami, FL

1979
De Armas Gallery, Miami, FL
La Petite Galerie, Miami, FL 
Meeting Point Gallery, Coral Gables, FL

1978
Lowe Museum, University of Miami, Coral Gables, FL
The Miami-Dade Public Library, Miami, FL
The Museum of Modern Arts of Latin America, Washington, D.C
The Bacardi Gallery, Miami, FL

1971–1973
Exhibit with the Gala Group, Gloria Luria Gallery and the Bacardi Gallery

1968
Generations of Cuban Painters, Koubek Center, Miami, FL
10 Cuban Painters, The Bacardi Gallery, Miami, FL; Washington, D.C.
Antilla Gallery, San Juan, Puerto Rico

1956
Venice Biennal, Venice, Italy

1953
Sao Paul Biennal, Sao Paul, Brazil

1950
Museum of Modern Art, Paris, France

1947
Lyceum Lawn Tennis Club, Havana, Cuba

1944
Conservatorio Nacional Hubert de Blanck, Havana, Cuba (solo)

Bibliography 
artnet.com, Jose Maria Mijares Biography. http://www.artnet.com/artists/jose-maria-mijares/biography.
Kendall Art Center The Rodriguez Collection
La Galeria Cuban Fine Art. Biography Painter Jose Maria Mijares. Jose Maria Mijares Biography & Full Exhibition List

References 

Cuban artists
American artists